John Riegel DeWitt (October 29, 1881 – July 28, 1930) was an American athlete, including a legendary college football player. As a track and field athlete, DeWitt competed mainly in the hammer throw.  He competed for the United States in the 1904 Summer Olympics held in St. Louis in the hammer throw where he won the silver medal.

He was also a prominent guard and kicker for the Princeton Tigers football team. In an attempt to name retroactive Heisman Trophy winners, Dewitt was awarded it for 1903. Walter Camp placed him on an all-time All-America team. One writer calls him Princeton's greatest football player. He was inducted into the College Football Hall of Fame in 1954.

References

External links

1881 births
1930 deaths
American male hammer throwers
Athletes (track and field) at the 1904 Summer Olympics
Olympic silver medalists for the United States in track and field
Princeton Tigers football players
All-American college football players
American football guards
College Football Hall of Fame inductees
American football drop kickers
Medalists at the 1904 Summer Olympics
People from Warren County, New Jersey
Players of American football from New Jersey